Jack Watts may refer to:
Jack Watts (baseball) (active 1913–1921), American baseball catcher
Jack Watts (politician) (born 1909), New Zealand politician
Jack Watts (footballer) (born 1991), Australian rules footballer

See also
John Watts (disambiguation)